Len Clearson (7 March 1901 – 20 October 1984) was an  Australian rules footballer who played with Geelong in the Victorian Football League (VFL).

Notes

External links 

1901 births
1984 deaths
Australian rules footballers from Victoria (Australia)
Geelong Football Club players
Stawell Football Club players